Margaret Hemsley (born 11 August 1971) is a former Australian racing cyclist. She won the Australian national road race title in 2002.

References

External links
 

1971 births
Living people
Australian female cyclists
Sportspeople from Canberra
Cyclists from the Australian Capital Territory
ACT Academy of Sport alumni
20th-century Australian women
21st-century Australian women